William Henry Anderdon (26 December 1816 – 28 July 1890) was an English Jesuit and writer, born in London.

After three years at King's College London, he matriculated at Oxford, when about nineteen, and entered Balliol College. Soon after, he won a scholarship at University College, Oxford, and took a degree in 1840. He received Anglican ordination, became vicar of Withyam, and in 1846 of St Margaret's Church, Leicester. In 1850 he was received into the Catholic Church in Paris by Father Gustave Delacroix de Ravignan. Ordained at Oscott by Bishop Ullathorne in 1853, he was appointed a lecturer at Ushaw College and afterwards a preacher and confessor at Newman University Church in Dublin. During his stay in Ireland the Franciscan convent of Drumshambo was founded, mainly through his efforts. In 1856, he was called to London by his uncle, Cardinal Henry Edward Manning, whose secretary he remained until he joined the Jesuits in 1872. From 1875 to 1889 he lived in Manchester, working as preacher, spiritual guide, and writer.

Father Anderdon began his literary apostolate by writing Catholic tales: "Bonneval, the Story of the Fronde" (1857); "Owen Evans, the Catholic Crusoe" (1862); "Afternoons with the Saints" (1863), "In the Snow, Tales of Mt. St. Bernard" (1866). All these stories, save the first, went through nine or ten editions, and were translated into German and French. Other valuable works from his pen are "Fasti Apostolici" (1882), "Evening with the Saints" (1883) and "Britain's Early Faith" (1887). His method in his writings was to understand rather than to exaggerate. Among his works, the best known are "Is Ritualism Honest?", "Controversial Papers" (1878), "Luther's Words and the Word of God" (8th thousand, 1883), "Luther at Table", "What sort of man was Luther?" (13th thousand, 1883). What do Catholics Really Believe?", "Confession to a Priest" (1881).

His newspaper work displayed a fine sense of irony in treating the polemics of the day. He was ever busy writing for the Weekly Register, the (English) Messenger of the Sacred Heart, the Xaverian, Merry England, the Month, the Irish Monthly, and other serial publications. His last works were The Old Religion of Taunton (1890); and Five Minutes' Sermons, the latter completed only in part at his death.

References 

1816 births
1890 deaths
19th-century English Anglican priests
19th-century English Roman Catholic priests
Alumni of Balliol College, Oxford
Alumni of King's College London
Alumni of University College, Oxford
Anglican priest converts to Roman Catholicism
English religious writers
19th-century English Jesuits